Jörg Stingl (born 6 July 1961) is a German swimmer. He competed in two events at the 1980 Summer Olympics for East Germany.

References

1961 births
Living people
German male swimmers
Olympic swimmers of East Germany
Swimmers at the 1980 Summer Olympics
Sportspeople from Chemnitz